John Goodrich Watkins (17 March 1913 - 12 January 2012) was a United States psychologist best known for his work in the areas of hypnosis, dissociation, and multiple personalities. With his wife, Helen Watkins, he developed ego-state therapy, which uses analysis of underlying personalities, rather than traditional talk therapy, to find the causes of psychological problems.

The most famous example of the use of ego-state therapy was the interrogation of the Hillside Strangler, in which Watkins solicited a confession by revealing the killer's multiple personalities.

Watkins also published research suggesting that hypnotic techniques for pain reduction may work by displacing the pain into “covert” ego states. Accordingly, the pain is not eliminated by the hypnotic intervention but is dissociated from conscious awareness and fully experienced by an underlying ego state. The underlying ego state may suffer trauma as a result experiencing the pain.

Watkins  graduated from the University of Idaho and received a Ph.D. from Columbia University. He was professor emeritus at the University of Montana, where he taught for many years.

John G Watkins died on 12 January 2012. He was 98 years old.

Publications

Articles 

 
 Watkins, John G. (1988). "The Management of Malevolent Ego State s in Multiple Personality Disorder".

Books

References

1913 births
2012 deaths
Columbia University alumni
University of Idaho alumni
University of Montana faculty
American hypnotists
20th-century American psychologists